Carol Rama (born Olga Carolina Rama; 17 April 1918 – 25 September 2015) was an Italian self-taught artist. Her painting encompassed an erotic, and sexual identity with specific references to female sensuality. She began to paint around the mid-thirties and exhibiting her work ten years later. Her work was relatively little known until curator Lea Vergine included several pieces in a 1980 exhibition, prompting Rama to revisit her earlier watercolour style.

Biography 

Born on 17 April 1918, Olga Carolina Rama was the youngest of three children born to Marta (née Pugliaro) and Amabile Rama, who had just returned to Turin the year before their daughter's birth after a six-year stint as migrant workers in Argentina. Much of Rama's earliest frame of reference comes from factory life. Through much of the 1920s, the business and the family prospered. Rama took riding lessons. She remembered it as a carefree time during which the family sang operatic arias and played dress-up at home. Her father, Amabile Rama, was a small-scale manufacturer in the engineering industry who produced automobiles under the trademark "Sintesi" as well as unusual unisex bicycles under the trademark "OLT". Among those working in his factory, at Via Digione 17 in Turin, there was a model employee, Vittorio Valletta, who in 1927 left "Sintesi" to place his talents at the service of FIAT. And it was following the birth of the FIAT that her father's company began to go downhill, and was declared bankrupt while Carol was still a child. Hard years followed for the previously prosperous Rama family. Her once secure middle-class family was socially marginalized. Gone were the afternoons of singing operatic arias and taking riding lessons. Rama said, "I started to experience rejection and derision from the same circles that had showered me with privileges before." Carol Rama's mother, Marta was committed to a psychiatric hospital in 1933; Rama was 15 years old. Six years later, Amabile, Rama's father, committed suicide.

Rama was still forming herself as a young woman during her mother's mental breakdown. Frequent visits to the asylum proved decisive: "I felt comfortable in that surrounding. Because it's there I began to have manners and upbringing without either cultural preparation or etiquette." Observing the unusual, quixotic characters in the asylum and absorbing that atmosphere has a liberating effect on the budding artist, which would inform her whole aesthetic and world view. Rama had enrolled at the art academy but school would not be her path forward; she skipped class and dropped out. Right off the bat she intuitively possessed her own self-assured style, line quality, subject matter, and twisted perspective. Specificity of vision, brazenly expressed, distinguishes Rama's earliest works.

Art practice 
As a painter, Rama began with sex and with watercolor. Infused with inwardness, watercolor has an intimate relation to the painter's body, with brushwork that tends to revolve around hand and wrist action, much like writing; its scale suited Rama's tabletop home-studio set-up. A medium of dilution and pollution, bleeding and spillage, watercolor was just the right thing for the then-young artist fascinated by bodies, orifices, fluids, and their intersubjective exchange. Color in her early watercolors is generally applied sparingly, in pale washes or barely at all, with strategic, vivid punctuations that draws attention to key erogenous zones: mouths, tongues, nipples, cunts, dicks, and assholes- wet holes and erotic plumbing primed for liquid flow. Of all the orifices, the mouth is Rama's favorite, as it is the most representative of desire. Her watercolors redesign anatomies, amputate and reorder limbs, realign orifices, and scramble physiological functions. Her women are often depicted armless, legless, or both, appearing broken like damaged classical ruins from Italy's ancient past.

At the end of the thirties Carol Rama also painted some twenty oils on canvas with a less scabrous content, as if her message had been influenced by the more conventional medium. They are most of all self portraits in which the coulees are at first laid on flat, in a manner that recalls some of Felice Castorati's early paintings, but the features are stylized to such an extent that they disappear, reducing the face and the body to mere splotches of lumpy paint.

The work of Carol Rama was also the object of what we could call a psychopathological reduction. Throughout the 19th century and a large part of the 20th, the art produced by sexual and political minorities and those of functional and cognitive diversity have been strained by epistemological-political taxonomies.

In 1945, Rama mounted her solo debut at Galleria Faber in Turin, exhibiting a range of early watercolors. But the show was not seen. It was immediately censored, shut down by police for its obscene, abject, and all around exuberantly offensive imagery before it could open to the public. Chronically excessive and too much for the scene to handle, Rama could continue to fall outside authorized spheres of visibility and slip through cracks between official categories. Throughout her long life in art, she fluently navigated along the margins and shifted positions across movements as a rogue agent, while consistently affirming her presence: she exhibited regularly for over half a century, presenting solo shows nearly every year, mostly in northern Italy, with rare breaks of more than a few years. Rama's oversexed, vulgar, dirty, and disfigured bodies roiled propriety and uptight norms, directly challenging the far-right national politics of the day.

By the early 1950s, she was painting irregular geometric compositions of lilting rhomboid and squares, often connected by long spidery lines or forming a directional field of implied movement. Books on her shelf from that time confirm formal affinities with Klee and Kandinsky as well as the influence of Cubism, especially Picasso, whose major exhibition in Milan in 1953 sent ripples across the Italian scene. Within the decade, her abstraction evolved into more painterly, impastoed, gestural canvases streaked with dark, textured forms that read as wounds or scars. An example of this would be a black monochrome  she painted called Melodramma (1960).  Around the mid fifties, Rama began to undo little by little the geometric conventions of the concrete art. Movement while also experimenting with new materials and techniques. Carol Rama invents organic abstraction, surrealism, concrete visceral art and porno brut. Carol Rama was profoundly influenced throughout the sixties by the experimental linguistic and visual poetry movement of Novissimi. Many of the writers of this movement reclaimed the "feminine" gaze as a tool for critiquing the dominant ideology, the scene was paradoxically male.

Starting in 1970, Rama began incorporating bicycle inner tubes into her work. She cut them up, splayed them out flat, hung them dangling off painting, and draped them limply over sculptural structures, flaccid bunches of long, hollow piping. The tires, ranging in color from black to rich rusty ocher, would always be associated with memories of her dead father and his factory, but formally they also echo the crowded multiplicity of dicks and snakes in her early watercolors, as well as more general signifiers of mobility, circulation, plumbing, and detumescence. With titles like Le Guerra e astratta [War is Abstract], Arsenale [Arsenal], and Presagi di Birnam [Omens of Birnam], Rama's rubber collages and assemblages are framed in relation to martial power, rubble, mass weaponry, and mass death.

After more than thirty years concocting virulent strains of abstraction, Rama returned to figuration. in 1979, her perversions of the 1930s and 1940s, previously censored by the authorities, were finally seen for the first time in an exhibition of a dozen early watercolors at Galleria Matano in Turin. Amid her return to figurative picture making, which lasted until her death in 2015 at age 97, Rama became fascinated with the mad cow outbreak [Bovine Spongiform Encephalopathy] that spiralled into a global media frenzy in the late nineties. She made a series of collaged paintings called La Mucca Pazza [The Mad Cow], dominated by bloated udder shapes cut out of leather and rubber and arranged on used mail sacks.

Her studio 
Heavy black curtains were drawn over her windows. She stated: "Black is the color that will help me to die. I'd like to paint everything black, it's a kind of incineration, a kind of wonderful agony..." The apartment's ceilings are high and dark. Charcoal gray and stale beige walls work with the dark wood floors, doors, furniture, and artifacts to further shade the rooms. Dwelling is this apartment at Via Napione 15 in Turin for over seventy years, Rama's studio-home became an extension of herself, her persona, and her singular artistic visions. On one set day a week, she used to open up her workshop abode to friends and intellectuals.

Part Museum, part asylum, part apothecary, part reliquary, part anthropological archive: her home overflows with small sculptures, talismans, relics, masks, exotic figurines, dolls, miniature charms, unusual tchotchkes, artifacts, shoes and shoe molds, vessels, glass bottles of perfume, strands of beads, pieces of jewelry she made, hanging ornaments, exhibition posters, etchings, paintings, and pictures everywhere. Boxes, crates, drawers, and shelves are crammed full of strips of rubber, tape measures, hammers, scissors, brushes, markers, pencil nubs, watercolor cakes, pastels, vials of pigment, jars of ink and Flashe paint. Seemingly random objects take on an allegorical charge, mirroring aspects of her personality.

Notable works 
 Nonna Carolina [Granny Carolina] (1936). Thought to be her earliest watercolor, the old woman's withered bust lies limply among so many prosthetic limbs and wooden shoe forms, her throat besieged by a half dozen black leeches like a soggy swamp monster, displaying her wetness as a necklace.
 Melodramma  [Melodrama] (1960). Features a bubbling, festering, charred tumor of texture stretched across the middle, surrounded by a handful of ready-made plastic skull-and crossbones stickers or tags.
 Le Guerra e astratta [War is Abstract]
 Arsenale [Arsenal]
 Presagi di Birnam [Omens of Birnam]
 La Mucca Pazza [The Mad Cow]

Major exhibitions 

 1945 Galleria Faber, Turin
 1946 Galleria Il Bosco, Turin
 1947 Galleria Il Bosco, Turin
 1955 Libreria Il Salto, Milano, (presentation by Albino Galvano)
 1957 Galleria La Bussola, Turin, (presentation by Galvano)
 1959 Galleria La Bussola, Turin, (presentation by Luigi Carluccio)
 1960 Galleria La Bussola, Turin, (presentation by Galvano)
 1964 Galleria Stampatori, Turin, (presentation by Galvano and Edoardo Sanguineti); Galleria La Carabaga, Sampierdarena (presentation by Edoardo Sanguineti)
 1965 Museo Civico, Pistoia, (presentation by Sanguineti)
 1966 Galleria Lutrin, Lione, (presentation by Sanguineti)
 1967 Galleria Numero, Rome, (presentation by Sanguineti); Galleria Fiamma Vigo, Rome, (presentation by Sanguineti)
 1970 Sala Bolaffi, Turin
 1971 Galleria La Bussola, Turin, (presentation by Sanguineti)
 1972 Galleria Anthea, Rome, (presentation by Sanguineti)
 1974 Galleria Il Fauno, Turin (presentation by Man Ray)
 1975 Galleria LP220, Turin, (presentation by Maurizio Fagiolo dell'Arco); Galleria Marin, Turin (presentation by Fagiolo dell'Arco)
 1976 Place and sign, Galleria Luciano Anselmino, Milan, (presentation by Sanguineti); Galleria Il Capricorno, Venice, (presentation by Sanguineti)
 1978 Galleria Weber, Turin, (presentation by Giancarlo Salzano)
 1979 Galleria Martano, Turin, (presentation by Paolo Fossati, Galvano, Marco Vallora)
 1980 Carol Rama: watercolors 1939-1941, work 1966-1980, Galleria Giancarlo Salzano, Turin (presentation by Corrado Levi and Sanguineti)
 1981 Carol Rama, works 1950-1955, Galleria D'Arte Maggiorotto, Cavallermaggiore (presentation by Galvano and Paolo Fossati)
 1983/84 Galleria Giancarlo Salzano, Turin (texts by Levi, Sanguineti, and Lea Vergine)
 1985 Sagrato del Duomo, Milan, (curated by Lea Vergine); Carol Rama: Seven Works, Galleria Giancarlo Salzano, Turin
 1987 Carol Rama, Works from 1937 to 1987, Galleria Dell'Oca, Rome, (presentation by Giuliano Briganti and Corrado Levi)
 1988 Casa del Mantegna, Mantova (presentation by Giorgio Manganelli, Francesco Bartoli, Giuliano Briganti and Anne-Marie Sauzeau Boetti)
 1989 Circolo degli Artisti, Turin (presentation by Paolo Fossati)
 1990 Galleria UXA, Novara; Carol Rama, works 1989/90, Galleria Giancarlo Salzano
 1991 Galleria Giancarlo Salzano; Paintings and drawings 1940/48, Galleria Giancarlo Salzano
 1993 Carol Rama: Quasi note azzurre (Almost blue notes), Galleria Giancarlo Salzano, XLV Biennale Internazionale d'Arte, Venice (presentation by Achille Bonito Oliva and Corrado Levi)
 1993/94 La corona di Keaton, 1993  Idilli, 1993  Inediti, 1952/57, Galleria Giancarlo Salzano
 1994 Galleria Monica De Cardenas, Milano
 1994-95 Carol Rama, Past to Present 1994-1930, Galleria Sprovieri, Rome (presentation by Achille Bonito Oliva and Maurizio Fagiolo dell'Arco)
 1995 Le stanze di Carolina 1939-1994, Galleria Otto, Bologna (presentation by Paolo Fossati and Dario Trento)
 1996 Galleria Il Ponte, Turin; Stamperia del Borgo Po, Turin (text by Sanguineti)
 1997 Carol Rama, works on paper, 1930s to present, Esso Gallery, New York (presentation by Filippo Fossati, Levi, Paolo Fossati, Sanguineti and Ingrid Schaffner); Galleria Giancarlo Salzano, Turin
 1998 Retrospective, Stedelijk Museum, Amsterdam traveling to ICA Boston; Incisioni Recenti, Franco Masoero Edizioni d'Arte, Turin
 1999 Carol Rama, GAM, Museo d'Arte Moderna, Turin
 2002 Galérie Anne de Villepoix, Paris
 2003 Biennale di Venezia, Venice, Italy; Carol Rama, past and present, Esso Gallery, New York
 2004 Fondazione Sandretto Re Rebaudengo, Turin
 2014 Carol Rama and Danh Vo, Nottingham Contemporary, Nottingham, UK
 2015 La Passion selon Carol Rama, The Musée d'Art Moderne de la Ville de Paris
 2016 The Passion According to Carol Rama, Irish Museum of Modern Art (IMMA), Dublin
 2017 Carol Rama: Antibodies, New Museum of Contemporary Art (New York, N.Y.) April 26-September 10, 2017.

Popular culture 
Her name appears in the lyrics of the Le Tigre song "Hot Topic."

References

External links 
Associazione Archivio Carol Rama
CAROL RAMA, "Sast Report: Culture"
An Interview with Carol Rama conducted by Corrado Levi (with Filippo Fossati), at Rama's Studio in Torino, September 1996.
Exhibition at Maccarone, New York October 25, 2008
Info on a past exhibition of Rama's work, with images of a few of her paintings
"Crazy Life", The Walrus, March 2005.
"Esso Gallery"
 http://www.imma.ie/en/page_237079.htm

1918 births
2015 deaths
20th-century Italian painters
21st-century Italian painters
Italian contemporary artists
Artists from Turin
Italian erotic artists
20th-century Italian women artists
21st-century Italian women artists
Italian women painters